Carlo Gariglio (born February 7, 1964 in Turin) is an Italian politician. He is the leader of Fascism and Freedom Movement (Movimento Fascismo e Libertà - MFL)  since December 2001.

In 1990 he had a degree in political science at the University of Turin. In the same year he began his political career as member of Fronte Nazionale, but in 1991 left the party to join the newly born Fascism and Freedom Movement.

From 1999 to 2004 he was Town Councilor in the municipality of Dusino San Michele.

From February 2002 he edits the monthly magazine of MFL "Il Lavoro Fascista" (The Fascist Work).

References

Italian neo-fascists
1964 births
Living people
Italian neo-fascist politicians